The Certificate of Entitlement (COE) is the quota licence for owning a vehicle in the city-state of Singapore. The licence is obtained from a successful winning bid in an open bid uniform price auction which grants the legal right of the holder to register, own and use a vehicle in Singapore for a period of 10 years. When demand is high, the cost of a COE can exceed the value of the car itself.

History 
On 1 May 1990, the then transportation unit of Singapore's Public Works Department (PWD) instituted a quota limit to vehicles called the COE when rising affluence in the city-state catapulted land transport network usage and previous measure to curb vehicle ownership by simply increasing road taxes was ineffective in controlling vehicle population growth. The premise was that the small city-state had limited land resources, ie. limited supply of roads and car parks / parking lots, (with scarce land being managed to have a greater emphasis on providing an adequate supply of homes), along with demand for vehicle ownership spiralling out of control, would result in traffic conditions exceeding the criterion of a healthy road network that is sustainable by developments in land transport infrastructure resulting in gridlock. Along with a controversial congestion tax called Electronic Road Pricing, the COE system is one of the key pillars in Singapore's traffic management strategies that aims to provide a sustainable urban quality of life.

Transport costs rose in tandem with the raising of the COE in February 2022.

System 
Before buying a new vehicle, potential vehicle owners in Singapore are required by the Land Transport Authority (LTA) to first place a monetary bid for a Certificate of Entitlement (COE). The number of available COEs is governed by a quota system called the Vehicle Quota System (VQS) and is announced by LTA in April of each year with a review in October for possible adjustments for the period of one year starting from May. Approximately one-twelfth of the yearly quota is auctioned off each month in a sealed-bid, uniform price auction system and successful bidders pay the lowest winning bid.

Vehicle Quota System (VQS) 
The number of COEs available to the public is regulated by the Vehicle Quota System (VQS) that is calculated every 6 months based on the following conditions:
 Actual number of vehicles taken off the roads (i.e. number of vehicles de-registered)
 Allowable growth in vehicle population
 Adjustments arising from temporary COEs that have expired or were cancelled.

Formula 
Since the change in the total motor vehicle population is given by the number of registrations minus the number of de-registrations and any unallocated quota in a given year may be carried over to the following year, the quota formula  is as follows:

 

In the formula above, the subscript  denotes calendar year and the subscript  denotes quota year (May to April). Initially, projected deregistrations for (calendar) year  were simply taken to be equal to actual deregistrations in  but from quota year 1999–2000 onwards, a projected number of deregistrations has been used.

Each year, the quota is set to allow for a targeted  percent growth in the total motor vehicle population, plus additional quota licenses to cover the number of motor vehicles that will be deregistered during the (calendar) year, plus any unallocated quota licenses from the previous quota year.

Validity 
The holder of a COE is allowed to own a vehicle for an initial period of 10 years, after which they must scrap or export their vehicle or bid for another COE at the prevailing rate if they wish to continue using their vehicle for an intended remaining lifespan.

At the end of the 10-year COE period, vehicle owners may choose to deregister their vehicle or to revalidate their COEs for another 5-year or 10-year period by paying the Prevailing Quota Premium, which is the three-month moving average of the Quota Premium for the respective vehicle category. You do not need to bid for a new COE to renew the existing COE of your vehicle. A 5-year COE cannot be further renewed, which means that at the end of a 5-year COE, the vehicle will have to be de-registered and either scrapped or exported to another country other than Singapore.

Depending on the value of the COE at the time of renewal vehicle owners are subjected to a somewhat emotional dilemma of whether to pay for a new COE which can amount to more than the market value of the vehicle or to deregister their vehicle.  The emotional dilemma is certainly enhanced when the vehicle owner is forced to deregister and scrap an otherwise road worthy vehicle due to lack of time or insufficient funds to afford the COE at the prevailing rate.

For comparison in terms of  vehicle value to COE value a Second Hand 2007 Mercedes-Benz C200K with a COE expiring in 2017 was advertised at S$86,800.  As of November 2013 for a category B Car with a displacement above 1600cc the COE is priced at S$84,578.

Auction process 
COE biddings starts on the first and third Monday of the month and typically lasts for three days to the following Wednesday. Bidding duration will be pushed further in some circumstances, including public holidays. Bidding results can be obtained through the local media on the same day or on a website.

All COE bids made in the two car categories (Cat A and B COEs) and the motorcycle category (Cat D COEs) must be made in the name of the buyer. Once COE is obtained, the vehicle has to be registered in the name of the bidder, i.e. Cat A, B and D COEs are non-transferable. To provide flexibility, successful COE bids in the Cat C (Goods vehicles and Buses) and Cat E (Open Category) in the name of the individuals are transferable. However these can only be transferred once within the first 3 months, while successful bids by companies are not transferable at all.

An additional restriction on car ownership is the requirement that motor vehicles more than ten years old, known as 'time expired' vehicles, must be either renew the COE for 5 or 10 years or de-register the vehicle for scrapping or exporting from Singapore, usually to neighbouring countries. For vehicles which have a renewed COE for 5 years the owner of the vehicle has to scrap the vehicle at the end of the period with no option to renew the COE.

Some of these vehicles have been exported farther to other right hand drive countries like New Zealand, which has traditionally imported such vehicles from Japan. The result of the peculiarities of the Singapore car market has resulted in Singapore being the second largest exporter of used cars in the world after Japan. Cars are exported to many countries, including Libya and Trinidad.

Owners of such vehicles are given financial incentives to do this, which include a Preferential Additional Registration Fee (PARF). This program was implemented to reduce traffic congestion and it complements other measures to curb road usage such as the Electronic Road Pricing (ERP) program.

COE Category Refinement in 2013 

In September 2013, The COE system has been refined to include a new criterion for Category A cars. Under the change, the engine power of Cat A cars should not exceed 97 kilowatts (kW). This is equivalent to about 130 brake horsepower. This is in addition to the previous criterion of engine capacity of Cat A cars not exceeding 1600 cubic centimetres. However, cars with engine power output exceeding 97 kW will be classified under Category B in COE bidding exercises starting February 2014 despite having engine capacity below 1600 cubic centimetres. The review of the COE categories' criteria was because LTA wanted to differentiate and regulate the buying of mass market and premium cars under Cat A in a bid to control COE prices that hovered closer and closer to S$100,000.

Categories 
Initially, COEs were divided into 8 categories but after many revisions, the system has been simplified to just five categories.
Categories A, B & D are non-transferable. Taxis used to be classed under category A but issuance of COEs became unrestricted from August 2012 onwards.

Prior to May 1999

Current Categories

Historical records

Car growth rate

COE range

References

External links

 Land Transport Authority

Taxation in Singapore
Singapore government policies
Sustainable transport
Road transport in Singapore
Auction case law